Ruan v. United States, 597 U.S. ___ (2022), was a case decided by the Supreme Court of the United States.

Background 

From January 2011 to May 2015, Dr. Xiulu Ruan operated a clinic with Dr. John Couch and prescribed over 475,000 opioids to his patients and was both indicted by the United States in 2016 under , under the Controlled Substances Act. The United States argued that they prescribed medicine that diverged with standard medical practice, the doctors, however, argued that they were prescribing medicine in accordance to standard medical practice. The doctors seek the judge to inform the jury that if they had acted in "good faith" they should not be guilty under , the judge disagreed and informed the jury that the doctors can be held guilty if their actions had deviated away from medical practice that was "unrecognizable" The jury ultimately disagreed with the doctors and held that they were guilty under .

Ruan and Couch appealed to the United States Court of Appeals for the Eleventh circuit and argued that the instructions to the jury in the district court was "legally erroneous", they argued since they believe that their practice was in accordance with standard medical practice, the jury should be informed about the "good faith" defense. The Court of Appeals disagreed and affirmed the lower court's decision.

Similarly in the case of Dr. Shakeel Kahn, he was charged under , for over prescription of Schedule II drug. The United States provided the same argument and Kahn rebutted with the same argument that he acted in "good faith", the trial judge told the jury that the "good faith" argument cannot stand ground if the actions of Kahn practiced medicine outside the bounds of standard medical practice. The jury agreed with the United States and handed down the guilty verdict. Kahn appealed to the United States Court of Appeals for the Tenth circuit and the court of appeals, similarly, affirmed the lower court decision.

In both cases, the defendant appealed to the Supreme Court for a writ of certiorari.

Supreme Court 

Certiorari was granted for both cases on November 5, 2021, and these cases were consolidated. Oral arguments were held on March 1, 2022. On June 27, 2022, the court ruled unanimously to vacate the judgement of the Eleventh Circuit. Justice Stephen Breyer wrote the majority opinion, while Justice Samuel Alito (along with Justices Clarence Thomas and Amy Coney Barrett) concurred in the judgement.

Opinion of the Court 
In his opinion, Justice Breyer wrote that the United States must prove the defendant "knowingly or intentionally" acted in an unauthorised manner beyond a reasonable doubt, once the defendant meets their "burden of proof". The court rejected the government's "mens rea" standard in which the government argued that the statute should be read as containing an "objectively reasonable good-faith effort". The court rejected such an interpretation stating that such an interpretation would put the burden on the defendant to proof that their mental state is of a "hypothetical 'reasonable' doctor". He cited Elonis v. United States as jurisprudence against the government requirement for the accused to prove that they are ”reasonable person" is flawed. Additionally, the court rejected the "bad-apple" argument, that the additional burden on the government to prove would allow doctors to escape criminal liability much more easily, by stating that such an argument could be applied to almost all cases.

References

External links 
 

2022 in United States case law
United States Supreme Court cases
United States Supreme Court cases of the Roberts Court
United States controlled substances case law